Meelis Kanep (born 27 May 1983) is an Estonian chess player who holds the FIDE title of Grandmaster (GM).

Born in Võru, Võru County, Kanep was the Estonian champion in 2004, 2005 and 2007 and winner of the Paul Keres Memorial Tournament in Tallinn, Estonia in 2005.

References

External links
 
 

1983 births
Living people
Estonian chess players
Chess grandmasters
Chess Olympiad competitors
Sportspeople from Võru